Milton Pollack (September 29, 1906 – August 13, 2004) was a United States district judge of the United States District Court for the Southern District of New York.

Education and career

Born in New York City, New York, Pollack received a Bachelor of Arts degree from Columbia University in 1927. He received a Juris Doctor from Columbia Law School in 1929. He was in private practice of law in New York City from 1929 to 1967.

Federal judicial service

Pollack was nominated by President Lyndon B. Johnson on May 24, 1967, to a seat on the United States District Court for the Southern District of New York vacated by Judge Wilfred Feinberg. He was confirmed by the United States Senate on June 12, 1967, and received his commission the same day. He assumed senior status on September 29, 1983. His service was terminated on August 13, 2004, due to his death in New York City.

See also
List of Jewish American jurists

References

Sources
Biography of Milton Pollack in the Federal Judicial Directory.
Damien Cave, "Milton Pollack, Noted Federal Judge, Dies at 97", New York Times, August 16, 2004.

1906 births
2004 deaths
Columbia College (New York) alumni
Columbia Law School alumni
Judges of the United States District Court for the Southern District of New York
United States district court judges appointed by Lyndon B. Johnson
20th-century American judges